Fol-de-Rol is a prime-time family variety special in the USA that was set at a medieval fair, produced by Sid and Marty Krofft and based on their 1968 live puppet show. It was broadcast by ABC on February 27, 1972. It was directed by Tony Charmoli and scripted by David Robison, Les Pine, Jerry Mayer and Dennis Kleinhole.

Plot
The special consists of a series of vignettes loosely tied together by the setting of a Renaissance fair. Howard Cosell narrates the story of Noah's Flood (Mickey Rooney); Ricky Nelson played a singing minstrel performing the song He Ain't Heavy, He's My Brother, a hit by the band The Hollies; Cyd Charisse performs a butterfly dance; Ann Sothern watches over proceedings as The Queen. Other songs performed are Classical Gas, composed by Mason Williams; Yma Sumac sings an unknown song. The show's ensemble performs Joy to the World (Three Dog Night song), (composed by Hoyt Axton). An instrumental here, as originally composed, Classical Gas (composed by Mason Williams) is played over the ensemble dancers.

Sources

External links 
 
 http://www.sidandmartykrofft.com/show/fol-de-rol/ Fol de Rol info at the Official Sid and Marty Krofft website

1972 television specials
1970s American television specials
Sid and Marty Krofft
American Broadcasting Company original programming
American television shows featuring puppetry